HD 102195 is an orange-hued star in the zodiac constellation of Virgo with a confirmed exoplanet companion. With an apparent visual magnitude of 8.07, the star is too faint to be seen with the naked eye. It is moving further away from the Earth with a heliocentric radial velocity of 1.85 km/s. This is a high proper motion star and a possible member of the η Cha stellar kinematic group.

The star HD 102195 is named Flegetonte. The name was selected in the NameExoWorlds campaign by Italy, during the 100th anniversary of the IAU. Flegetonte is the underworld river of fire from Greek Mythology in the Italian narrative poem on the afterlife Divina Commedia.

This K-type main-sequence star has a stellar classification of K0 V. It is a quasi-periodic variable star with a cycle of 11.5 days, a variation range of 3.65%, and a phased amplitude of 94%. HD 102195 is around six billion years old with a rotation period of 12.3 days. It has 88% of the Sun's mass and 84% of the Sun's radius. It is radiating 49% of the Sun's luminosity from its photosphere at an effective temperature of 5,283 K.

In 2005, an orbiting companion was detected using the Exoplanet Tracker instrument. This near Jupiter-mass exoplanet has an orbital period of 4.1 days with a circular orbit. By comparing the rotation period and radius of the star with the projected rotational velocity, Melo et al. (2007) derived an orbital inclination of 47°.

See also
 List of extrasolar planets

References

K-type main-sequence stars
Planetary systems with one confirmed planet
Virgo (constellation)
BD+03 2549
102195
057370